"Dope Bitch" (clean version titled "Dope Chick") is a song by American singer-songwriter and record producer The-Dream, featuring American rapper Pusha T. The song was released as a single for digital download in the United States on July 24, 2012. The song is included on The-Dream's EP Climax, which was ultimately a bonus CD on his fourth studio album IV Play (2013).

Music video
The music video for "Dope Bitch" was released on July 17, 2012.

Charts

Release history

References

2012 singles
2012 songs
Def Jam Recordings singles
The-Dream songs
Pusha T songs
Songs written by The-Dream
Songs written by Pusha T